Parliamentary elections were held in Cameroon on 29 May 1983. The country was a one-party state at the time, with the Cameroonian National Union as the sole legal party. 2,600 candidates ran for a place on the CNU list, with 120 eventually winning a place on it, equal to the number seats available in the National Assembly. The party won all seats with a 99.19% turnout.

Results

References

Cameroon
Parliamentary election
Elections in Cameroon
One-party elections
Single-candidate elections
Cameroonian parliamentary election